The MARS (Mini Assault Rifle System) was an experimental, scaled-down variant of the M16 rifle tested by Colt as a personal defense weapon (PDW) around 1997. It was chambered for the experimental 5.56×30mm MARS cartridge. The rifle was patented in 1998 (US patent no. 5,827,992).

See also
Amogh carbine

References

External links
Pictures & Patent Info

ArmaLite AR-10 derivatives
Colt rifles
Personal defense weapons